PastPerfect Museum Software is an application for collections archiving. It is designed for museums, but may be used by various institutions including libraries, archives, and natural history collections. PastPerfect allows for the database storage of artifacts, documents, photographs, and library books.

History 
PastPerfect was introduced in 1998 as the primary product of the then Pastime Software Company Inc. It was released in version two later the same year, updated to version three in 2001, and then to version four in 2004. It updated to version five in 2010, which remains the most current edition of the program. Pastime Software Company eventually changed its name to PastPerfect Software Inc. after 2007.

Functionality 
PastPerfect operates with four basic catalogs for sorting collections material. There is the archive catalog for storing documents, the photograph catalog for storing photos, tintypes, paintings, etc.; the objects catalog for storing three-dimensional artifacts, and the library catalog for storing books that would be included in the institution's library. Images can be uploaded into the catalog, with multiple photos per record. It also stores donor information, and automatically generates Deed of Gift forms and thank you letters upon completing certain steps of the accessioning process.<ref>Porter, S. (2007). PastPerfect software review. Retrieved from http://ercpierce.blogspot.com/2007/03/pastperfect-software-review.html</ref> Certain extensions allow for the inclusion of Oral History records and transcripts and there is an additional online function that allows institutions to digitize their collections and make them free to browse on the internet.

PastPerfect also contains a contact list function, for storing donors, members, and employee contact information in a similar catalog format as the rest of the program.

 PastPerfect Online PastPerfect Online is a third-party online service for organizing digitized content for museums, libraries, and archives, with 602 current clients. PastPerfect Museum Software'' has in-house and hosted solutions.

Other museum software vendors 
 
 Altru by Blackbaud
 Modes
 My Tours
 Vernon Systems
 Museum Anywhere
 Explorer Systems
 Artifax Software
 Gatemaster

References

External links
 FAQ: PastPerfect Museum Software Offline Museum Management
 PastPerfect Online Main site
 PastPerfect OnlineClient Data

Databases
Museum companies
Archival science